The Bishop's Palace, also known as Gresham's Castle, is an ornate  Victorian-style house, located on Broadway and 14th Street in the East End Historic District of Galveston, Texas.

History

The Gresham mansion was made all of stone, and was sturdy enough to withstand the great hurricane of 1900.  The Greshams welcomed hundreds of survivors of the hurricane into their home.

The house was built between 1887 and 1893 by Galveston architect Nicholas J. Clayton for lawyer and politician Walter Gresham, his wife Josephine, and their nine children. In 1923 the Roman Catholic Diocese of Galveston purchased the house, and, situated across the street from the Sacred Heart Church, it served as the residence for Bishop Christopher E. Byrne.  After the diocesan offices were moved to Houston, the diocese opened the mansion to the public in 1963, with proceeds from tours being used to help fund the UT medical school's Newman Center, which operated in the basement.

The home is estimated to have cost $250,000 at the time; today its value is estimated at over $5.5 million.

The house is now owned by the Galveston Historical Foundation and self-guided tours are available daily. A portion of each admission supports the preservation and restoration of the property.

Layout

Bishop's Palace has four floors.  The raised basement which once housed the kitchen and servant's areas now contains the store.  This basement is followed by three formal floors.

First floor
 Entryway
 Parlor
 Music Room
 Rotunda Staircase
 Library/Office
 Dining Room - Mrs. Gresham painted the fresco of cherubs on the ceiling.
 Conservatory
 Pantry
 Kitchen - This room was originally just a warming kitchen, but Bishop Byrne expanded the room.
 Servant's Vestibule - Contains the dumbwaiter and the servant's staircase.
 Coat Closet - The coat closet is tucked around the back side of the rotunda staircase and contains a Pullman sink from the famed Pullman railcars.

Second floor
 Living Room - The Gresham family often listened to music here during the hot summer months.
 Bishop's Bedroom - This was originally a bedroom of one of the Gresham daughters, but Bishop Byrne chose it for his own with its private balcony and lighting.  He converted the closet into a bathroom.
 Chapel - This was also previously one of the Gresham daughter's bedrooms.  When the Diocese moved in, the windows were replaced with stained-glass, and a fresco depicting the four gospel writers was painted on the ceiling.  The room was also outfitted with an altar and six prayer kneelers.
 Mr. Gresham's Room
 Mrs. Gresham's Room
 Bathroom - The tub in this bathroom is of note for its three spigots: one for hot, one cold, and one for rainwater.
 Bedroom for guests or the children's governess.

Third floor
 The boys’ rooms
 Mrs. Gresham's art studio
 Additional storage

See also

List of National Historic Landmarks in Texas
National Register of Historic Places listings in Galveston County, Texas
Recorded Texas Historic Landmarks in Galveston County

References

External links

Long, Christopher.  "Bishop's Palace". Handbook of Texas Online, uploaded June 12, 2010.
Early 20th century photographic postcards of Texas buildings at the University of Houston Digital Library
 Bishop's Palace Galveston's Grandest Home \\ I on Oklahoma Magazine

Culture of Galveston, Texas
Houses on the National Register of Historic Places in Texas
National Register of Historic Places in Galveston County, Texas
Episcopal palaces
Roman Catholic Archdiocese of Galveston–Houston
Museums in Galveston, Texas
Historic house museums in Texas
Palaces in the United States
Houses in Galveston, Texas
Houses completed in 1893
Religious buildings and structures completed in 1893
Recorded Texas Historic Landmarks